Taiwan was under Japanese rule after the First Sino-Japanese War, as per the Treaty of Shimonoseki of 1895. There were still several changes until the Japanese political system was adopted in 1920. This system was de facto abolished in 1945 and de jure in 1952.

Introduction
Administrative divisions of Taiwan by types and times. Like the administrative divisions in mainland Japan, most of them are translated to "prefectures" in English.

Early years (1895–1901)
The political divisions changed frequently between 1895 and 1901.

Chō (1901–1920)
The former system was abolished 11 November 1901, and twenty local administrative offices (chō) were established. Usage of Ken divisions was discontinued.

Structural hierarchy

Prefectures

 Shinkō, Byōritsu, Toroku, Ensuikō were split and merge with the two Chō in the right.

Demographics
Population of Formosa according to census taken 31 December 1904, arranged by district.

Shū and Chō (1920–1945)

Under a "Dōka policy" (同化) in which the Japanese considered the Taiwanese to be separate but equal, the political divisions in Taiwan became similar to the system used in mainland Japan in 1920.

Structural hierarchy

Prefectures

 Hōko Prefecture was divided from Takao Prefecture in 1926

Cities
There were 11 cities in Taiwan in 1945. Most of them are still the most populous municipalities in the country today. The ōaza (大字) in the city center may be named chō (町).

Demographics

The 1941 (Shōwa 16) census of Taiwan was 6,249,468. 93.33% of the population were Taiwanese which consisted of both Han Taiwanese and "civilized" Taiwanese aborigines. Tainan had the largest population followed by Taichū and Taihoku. The largest concentration of ethnic Japanese were in Taihoku followed by Takao and Tainan.

Changes in 1945
When the Republic of China began to rule Taiwan in 1945, the government simply changed the names of the divisions, and named the Aboriginal areas. Those changes were not recognized by the Allies after the surrender of Japan.

 Most of the cities in Taiwan became provincial cities, but Yilan (宜蘭市 Giran) and Hualien (花蓮市 Karen) became the first two county-administered cities in the ROC.

See also
Administrative divisions of Taiwan
Administrative divisions of Japan
Prefectures of Japan
Governor-General of Taiwan

References

Bibliography

 
Former administrative divisions of countries